Vidya ( Education) is an Indian social drama television series that has been broadcast since 9 September 2019 on Colors TV. Produced by Mahesh Pandey, it stars Namish Taneja and Meera Deosthale.

The show was taken off the air abruptly due to the COVID-19 pandemic lockdown in India on 30 March 2020. Later, it was announced that the show will not be brought back after the lockdown bringing the show to an abrupt ending.

Premise
Vidya is a quaint and superstitious widow who awaits a letter from the government regarding her job. However, her luck takes a turn for the worse when she gets the job of teaching English at a school. But unknown to the world she is an illiterate. Enters IAS Vivek Vardhaan Singh, a righteous officer who takes over the charge of the city as the new District Magistrate. He respects Vidya a lot and gradually starts falling in love with her despite of her being a widow. Then there is a corrupt politician Nanku Singh creating hurdles in the ways of both of them in many tasks of development. When Vidya reveals she is illiterate Vivek is furious and hurt. By then even she had fallen in love with him and tries to explain her situation and the whole story to him how she was married off and on the very day of her wedding her husband an army officer was called for the duty and got martyred. So to support her in laws she was forced to take up the job. Vivek accepts Vidya and promises to teach her. Vivek's mother lays a condition of accepting Vidya only if she becomes a teacher in the reality with all the necessary qualifications. Here begins the journey of Vidya of completing her education.......

Cast

Main
 Meera Deosthale as Vidya Vivek Singh – Ramesh and Durga's daughter; Mohan's sister; Ram's former wife; Vivek's wife ; Mamta's daughter-in-law (2019–2020)
 Ayat Shaikh as Young Vidya Singh (2019)
 Namish Taneja as DM. Vivek Singh – Mamta and Vardhan's son; Vidya's husband; Mohan's brother in law; Durga and Ramesh's son in law(2019–2020)

Recurring
 Vaquar Shaikh as Nanku Singh – Ranjana's brother; Kalindi's husband; Vidya's admirer;(2019–2020)
 Anshu Shrivastav as Kalindi Singh – Nanku's wife ; Ranjana's sister in law; Jagat's sister; Parvati's daughter-in-law (2019–2020)
 Aaloak Kapoor as Ramesh Singh – Durga's husband; Vidya and Mohan's father; Vivek's father in law; Keerti's father-in-law(2019)
 Sanya Dutt as Durga Singh – Ramesh's wife; Vidya and Mohan's mother; Vivek's mother in law; Keerti's mother-in-law (2019)
 Anamika Kadamb as Ranjana Thakur – Nanku's sister ; Kalindi's sister in law(2019–2020) (Jailed)
 Sanjay Pandey as Dharam Singh – Parbatiya's husband; Ram and Bablu's father; Vidya's former Father in law (2019–2020)
 Uma Basu as Parbatiya Devi – Dharam's wife; Ram and Bablu's mother; Vidya's former mother-in-law (2019–2020)
 Mansi Srivastava as Mehak Verma – Vivek's childhood friend; Avatar's love interest (2020)
 Manmohan Tiwari as Ram Singh – Parbatiya and Dharam's son; Vidya's former husband (2019) (Cameo)
 Geeta Tyagi as Mamta Singh - Vardhan's wife; Vivek's mother ; Vidya's mother-in-law 
 Akash Mukherjee as Bablu Singh – Parbhatiya and Dharam's son; Ram's brother ; Vidya's former brother in law(2019–2020)
 Sudhanshu Sharan as Mohan Singh– Durga and Ramesh's son; Vidya's brother; Keerti's husband (2019)
 Rasika Singh as Keerti Singh – Mohan's wife; Vidya's sister in law; Durga and Ramesh's daughter-in-law (2019)
 Garima Gupta as Principal Monali Verma (2019–2020)
 Jeetendra Trehan as DM Sharma (2019) (Dead)
 Zarina Roshan Khan as Parvati Singh – Nanku and Ranjana's mother; Kalindi's mother-in-law  (2019) (Dead)
 Vikrant Singh Rajpoot as Avtaar Singh – Politician; Vidya's brother; Mehak's love interest  (2019–2020)
 Mohit Sharma as Anand – Vivek's assistant (2019–2020)
 Lilliput as School Principal Manohar Mishra (2019–2020)
 Swadesh Mishra as Jagat ; Kalindi's brother; nanaku's brother in law (2019–2020)

Special appearances
 Sara Khan to promote Dance Performed in School Party (2019)
 Jigyasa Singh as Heer Singh from Shakti - Astitva Ke Ehsaas Ki (2020)

Cancellation
Due to low TRP's at 7 pm time slot, the show went off-air during COVID-19 pandemic. The show went off air without completing it's story on 30 March 2020. This show was eventually replaced by Ishq Mein Marjawan 2 on 13 July 2020.

References

External links

 
 
 Vidya on Voot

2019 Indian television series debuts
Colors TV original programming